Amerila nigroapicalis is a moth of the subfamily Arctiinae. It was described by Per Olof Christopher Aurivillius in 1900 and is found in Cameroon, the Democratic Republic of the Congo, Equatorial Guinea and Nigeria.

References

 , 1899 [1900]: Diagnosen neuer Lepidopteren aus Afrika von Christopher Aurivillius. 5. Entomologisk Tidskrift 20: 233-258.
 , 1997: A revision of the Afrotropical taxa of the genus Amerila Walker (Lepidoptera, Arctiidae). Systematic Entomology 22 (1): 1-44.

Moths described in 1900
Amerilini
Moths of Africa